The Gehrlein Precursor is an American, high-wing, single seat glider designed by Larry Gehrlein in 1965 and assembled from Schweizer Aircraft parts.

Design and development
There was just one Schweizer 1-23C built and it was owned and modified by Gehrlein. The aircraft was crashed and rebuilt with new 1-23D wings. The 1-23C's damaged wings were rebuilt and formed the basis for the Precursor. The fuselage for the Precursor started life as a 1963 model Schweizer 1-26A. The two components were reworked by Gehrlein and his two sons, Rod and Jay, in 1965. They took the 1-26A fuselage and mounted the wings from the Schweizer 1-23C, modifying the fuselage, which had mounted the original 1-26 wings in the mid position to accept the 1-23C wings in the high position.  The resulting aircraft is registered with the Federal Aviation Administration in the Experimental -  Racing - Amateur Built - Exhibition category.

The Precursor is of all-metal construction and features a fixed monowheel landing gear, with a small tail caster. Only one Precursor was built.

Operational history
PIlot reports indicate that the Precursor climbs well in thermals and exhibits stable handling.

Gehrlein eventually sold the one-of-a-kind design to Les Stoner of Houston, Texas and today it is owned by Gehrlein's son, Rod, and based in Erie, Pennsylvania.

Specifications (Precursor)

See also

References

1960s United States sailplanes
Homebuilt aircraft
Aircraft first flown in 1965